Obediah Parker Goucher (February 2, 1865 – June 12, 1947) was a school teacher, insurance agent and political figure in Nova Scotia, Canada. He represented Annapolis County from 1925 to 1933 as a Liberal-Conservative member.

He was born in Melvern Square, Annapolis County, Nova Scotia, the son of W. Henry Goucher and Margaret Parker. He was educated at the provincial normal school and Acadia University. In 1893, he married Ardellice K. Dodge. Goucher was mayor of Middleton from 1912 to 1915. He served in the province's Executive Council as a minister without portfolio from 1928 to 1930 and as Minister of Agriculture from 1930 to 1933. Goucher died in Middleton at the age of 80.

References 
 A Directory of the Members of the Legislative Assembly of Nova Scotia, 1758-1958, Public Archives of Nova Scotia (1958)

1865 births
1947 deaths
Progressive Conservative Association of Nova Scotia MLAs
Mayors of places in Nova Scotia